Govind Swarup (March 23, 1929 – September 7, 2020) was a pioneer in radio astronomy.  In addition to research contributions in multiple areas of astronomy and astrophysics, he was a driving force behind the building of "ingenious, innovative and powerful observational facilities for front-line research in radio astronomy".

Swarup was the key scientist behind concept, design and installation of the Ooty Radio Telescope (Ootacamund, India) and the Giant Metrewave Radio Telescope (GMRT) near Pune.
Swarup was the founding director of the National Centre for Radio Astrophysics (NCRA) at the Tata Institute of Fundamental Research (TIFR).
Under his leadership, a strong group in radio astrophysics was built at Tata Institute of Fundamental Research that is comparable to the best in the world.

He published over 125 research papers, edited 4 books, and held at least two patents. He contributed to the fields of solar radio emission, radio galaxies, quasars, pulsars, interplanetary scintillation,  dark matter and cosmology.

Early life and education 
Govind Swarup was born in the town of Thakurdwara in Uttar Pradesh in 1929. He attended  Allahabad University, where he received his BSc degree (1948) and MSc in Physics (1950).

Swarup spent several years at the  National Physical Laboratory in Delhi with K. S. Krishnan (1950–53), measuring the spin resonance of electrons. Because there was interest in the newly developing field of radio astronomy, arrangements were made to send Swarup and another student to the  Radio Physics Division of CSIRO, in Sydney, Australia, to work with Joseph Pawsey and learn to build radio arrays for studying the sun. In March 1953 Swarup arrived at Potts Hill in New South Wales on a 2-year fellowship. He worked closely with Pawsey, Wilbur Norman Christiansen, John Gatenby Bolton, Bernard Mills and others.
Swarup was also able to arrange for parts from a discarded 32-element array to be sent from Australia to the National Laboratory in India.  He returned to the National Laborary from 1955–56.

When the array parts were seriously delayed, Swarup went to the United States.  He worked as a research associate at the Radio Astronomy Station of Harvard University at Fort Davis, Texas (1956–57).  He then became a Research Assistant at Stanford University (1957–60) in California, completing his doctoral thesis with Ron Bracewell.
Swarup  received his PhD from Stanford University in 1961 and became an assistant professor at Stanford University (1961–63).

Swarup was later awarded a number of honorary degrees:  Doctor of Engineering, University of Roorkee in 1987 and Doctor of Science, Banaras Hindu University in 1996.  He was also given an honorary Doctor of Science by  Pandit Ravishankar Shukla University, Raipur in 2010.

Career
Returning from Stanford to India in March 1963, Swarup joined TIFR as a reader at the request of Dr. Homi Bhabha. In 1965, he became associate professor, professor in 1970, and professor of eminence in 1989. He became project director of the GMRT in 1987, centre director of the National Centre for Radio Astrophysics (NCRA) of TIFR in 1993 and retired from TIFR in 1994.

Major Contributions

CSIRO and Harvard 
While at CSIRO, Swarup and R. Parthasarathy converted Potts Hill's L-shaped grating radio interferometer telescope to an operating wavelength of 500 MHz. They used it to make daily observations and developed a one-dimensional map of the Quiet Sun.
While at the Harvard College Observatory Swarup  discovered 'Type U' solar radio bursts.

Stanford 
At Stanford Swarup continued to make studies of radio emissions from the Quiet Sun and developed a gyro-radiation model of solar emissions of  microwave radiation.  He explained the emission mechanism of sunspots in terms of  gyroresonance processes.

In 1959, Swarup developed a technique for the round-trip transmission of phase measurements that enabled the phase equalization of all 32 antennas in an array to be carried out in minutes rather than weeks. Published in 1961, this technique has been used in radio interferometers world-wide.

In 1962 Swarup used the Stanford compound-grating interferometer to examine Cygnus A.  Previous researchers had shown that the radio galaxy contained two distinct radio lobes.  In 1963 Swarup reported the presence of a continuous  "bridge"  of radio emissions between the two lobes, the first instance of a steep spectrum bridge. Such bridges are used to estimate the age of a radio galaxy.

Kalyan Radio Telescope 
Returning to India on April 2, 1963, Swarup began to assemble a group at the Tata Institute of Fundamental Research near Mumbai.  With the antennae from Potts Hill, they constructed the Kalyan Radio Telescope, the first radio telescope array in India. Located at Kalyan, near Mumbai, India, it was completed in 1965.

Ooty Radio Telescope (ORT) 
Swarup's next major installation was the Ooty Radio Telescope (ORT) at Ooty in South India.  It became operational in 1970, first observing a lunar occultation event on February 18, 1970.  The design was "unique and innovative", "the first large equatorial cylindrical parabolic radio telescope with steerability in both directions".  530 m long 30 m wide, it was located at an incline on a hill so that it would have a long axis of rotation parallel to the axis of the earth.  The design made it possible to track the hour angle of celestial radio sources for 9.5 hrs.

ORT has been used for a  number of important observations. Using lunar occultation, it provided independent evidence for the Big Bang model. 
Occultation observations of Sagittarius A* at the Galactic Center of the Milky Way galaxy supported the separation of its emissions into two dimensions, thermal and non-thermal.  After fifty years, ORT continues to be used to observe solar winds, coronal mass ejections, and pulsars.

In 1979, Swarup went on sabbatical at the Very Large Array (VLA) in New Mexico, where studied jets and hot spots. 
During the 1980s, he studied the polarization of radio cores of galaxies and quasars.

Giant Metrewave Radio Telescope (GMRT) 
Beginning in 1985, Swarup began construction of the Giant Metrewave Radio Telescope (GMRT), at Khodad near Pune.  The telescope was completed in 1997. Inspired by the Very Large Array, and the Arecibo Telescope,  GMRT contains 30 steerable parabolic dishes, each of them 45m in diameter, arranged in a Y-shape array over a 25 km area.
Using a novel SMART (Stretched Mesh Attached to Rope Trusses) design concept, GMRT is highly versatile. It is the world's largest radio telescope for the detection of frequencies in the range of 130–1430 MHz and has been used by researchers from over 40 countries.  GMRT was recognized as a key historical achievement in electrical and electronic engineering and given IEEE Milestone status in 2020.

One of the concerns behind the development of the GMRT was the question of dark matter and the nature of the universe. A sensitive radio telescope at an appropriate frequency (327 MHz) was needed to test predictions about whether the universe contained hot dark matter (HDM) or cold dark matter (CDM). 

Swarup has used the GMRT to observe the emission and absorption of atomic hydrogen from objects in the early Universe, examine the cosmic cold spot, and study radio emissions from Venus.

Awards and Memberships of technological Committees 

Membership of Professional Societies: 
Royal Society, London;
Royal Astronomical Society, London;
Indian Academy of Sciences;
Indian National Science Academy;
National Academy of Sciences, Allahabad, India;
Third World Academy of Sciences;
Indian Geophysical Union; 
Maharashtra Academy of Sciences;
Institution of Electronics & Telecommunication Engineers; 
Indian Physics Association; 
Indian Physical Society; 
International Academy of Astronautics; 
Pontifical Academy of Sciences;

Positions held: 
Astronomical Society of India (President 1975–77); 
International Astronomical Union (IAU) (President, Commission 40 on Radio Astronomy, 1979–82); 
Executive Committee, Inter Union Commission for Frequency Allocation (IUCAF till 1995); 
IAU Working Group for Future Large Scale Facilities (1994–2000); 
Chairman, Indian National Committee for International Union of Radio Science (URSI) (1986–88 & 1995–97); 
Post-detection Sub-Committee of SETI of International Astronautical Federation (Chairman, 1994–98); 
Chairman, URSI Committee for Developing Countries (1996–2002); 
URSI Standing Committee for Future General Assemblies (1999–2002). 
Editorial Boards, Indian Journal of Radio & Space Physics (1990–2000), 
National Academy of Sciences, India; (1997–2000).

Awards: 
1973 Padma Shri; 
1972 S.S. Bhatnagar, Council of Scientific & Industrial Research, India; 
1974 Jawaharlal Nehru Fellowship for 2 years; 
1984 P.C. Mahalanobis Medal, Indian National Science Academy; 
1986 Biren Roy Trust Medal, Indian Physical Society, Calcutta; 
1987 Dr. Vainu Bappu Memorial Award, Indian National Science Academy; 
1987 Tskolovosky Medal, Federation of Cosmonautics, USSR; 
1987 Meghnad Saha Medal, National Academy of Sciences, India;
1988 TWAS Prize in Physics; 
1990 John Howard Dellinger Gold Medal, International Union of Radio Sciences; 
1990 R.D. Birla Award in Physics, Indian Physics Association; 
1991 FIE Foundation Award for Eminence in Science & Technology, Ichhalkaranji, India; 
1993 Gujar Mal Modi Science Award, Modi Foundation, India; 
1993 The C.V. Raman Medal, Indian National Science Academy; 
1994 Sir Devaprasad Sarbadhikari Medal, Calcutta University; 
1995 M.P. Birla Award, Birla Institute of Astronomy and Planetarium Sciences, Calcutta; 
1999 12th Khwarizmi International Award, Iran; 
2001 H.K. Firodia Award; 
2005 Herschel Medal of the Royal Astronomical Society;
2006, Lifetime Achievement Award by the University of Pune; 
2007 Grote Reber Medal;
2007 Presidents Medal by the Indian Science Congress; 
2009 Homi Bhabha Award for Lifetime Achievement by the Prime minister of India.

Personal life
Prof. Govind Swarup was married to Bina Swarup and resided in Pune, India. He had one daughter and one son. His daughter Anju Basu is married to Rajiv Basu and his son, Vipin Swarup is married to Natasha Swarup.

Swarup had an elder brother in Kanpur, Mahesh Swarup Agarwal, who was an industrialist.

References

External links

 
 Swarup, Govind. Stanford Microwave Spectroheliograms, United States Airforce: Radioscience Laboratory, Stanford Electronics Laboratories, Stanford University, 1960.

Radio astronomers
Members of the Pontifical Academy of Sciences
Stanford University alumni
Recipients of the Padma Shri in science & engineering
Recipients of the Shanti Swarup Bhatnagar Award in Engineering Science
Fellows of the Royal Society
People from Moradabad district
1929 births
2020 deaths
Jawaharlal Nehru Fellows
TWAS laureates